Ronald Woodson Harris (born September 3, 1948), nicknamed "Mazel", is an American former  boxer, who won a gold medal in the lightweight division at the 1968 Summer Olympics.

Personal
Harris was born in Canton, Ohio.

Amateur career 
Harris won the 1966, 1967, and 1968 National AAU lightweight championship and was the 1968 Olympic gold medalist at 132 pounds.

1968 Olympic results
Below are the results of Ronnie Harris who competed for the United States as a lightweight boxer at the 1968 Olympics in Mexico City:

 Round of 64: bye
 Round of 32: defeated Lee Chang-kyi (South Korea) on points, 5-0
 Round of 16: defeated John Stracey (Great Britain) on points, 4-1
 Quarterfinal: defeated Mohamed Muruli (Uganda) on points, 5-0
 Semifinal: defeated Calistrat Cutov (Romania) on points, 5-0
 Final: defeated Josef Grudzein (Poland) on points, 5-0 (won gold medal)

Professional career 
Harris turned professional in 1971 and was undefeated until 1978. In 1978 he took on WBC and WBA middleweight title holder Hugo Pastor Corro for the then undisputed world Middleweight title, but lost a decision. A notably win in his career was when Harris defeated future middleweight world champion Alan Minter. He retired in 1982.

He opened his own boxing school in 1981 in New York City on West 32nd street. One of his first students was Warren J. Miller, a twice Navy Seal/DEA Agent. He trained Warren Miller to win the Ohio State Golden Gloves in 1981.

References

External links 
 Ronnie Harris' profile at databaseOlympics
 Ronnie Harris' profile at Sports Reference.com

1948 births
Living people
Boxers from Ohio
Olympic boxers of the United States
Boxers at the 1968 Summer Olympics
Olympic gold medalists for the United States in boxing
Medalists at the 1968 Summer Olympics
Sportspeople from Canton, Ohio
American male boxers
Pan American Games medalists in boxing
Pan American Games bronze medalists for the United States
Boxers at the 1967 Pan American Games
Lightweight boxers
Medalists at the 1967 Pan American Games